Moldovan and Moldavian refer to something of, from, or related to Moldova or Moldavia. In particular, it may refer to:
Moldovans, the main ethnic group of the Republic of Moldova
Moldavians, the inhabitants of the historical territory of the Principality of Moldavia (14th century to 1859)
 Moldavians, residents of Moldavia (region of Romania)
Moldovan language, one of the two names used for the official Romanian language of the Republic of Moldova
Moldavian dialect, one of the several regional varieties of the Romanian language
Moldovan (surname)

See also 
Moldavians (disambiguation)

Language and nationality disambiguation pages